The 2018 Zagreb Ladies Open was a professional tennis tournament played on outdoor clay courts. It was the eighth edition of the tournament and was part of the 2018 ITF Women's Circuit. It took place in Zagreb, Croatia, on 3–9 September 2018.

Singles main draw entrants

Seeds 

 1 Rankings as of 27 August 2018.

Other entrants 
The following players received a wildcard into the singles main draw:
  Lea Bošković
  Anita Husarić
  Bojana Jovanovski Petrović
  Silvia Njirić

The following players received entry using a protected ranking:
  Lina Gjorcheska
  Alexandra Panova

The following players received entry from the qualifying draw:
  Ágnes Bukta
  Cornelia Lister
  Angelica Moratelli
  Paula Ormaechea

Champions

Singles

 Tereza Mrdeža def.  Paula Ormaechea, 2–6, 6–4, 7–5

Doubles

 Andrea Gámiz /  Aymet Uzcátegui def.  Elena Bogdan /  Alexandra Cadanțu, 6–3, 6–4

External links 
 2018 Zagreb Ladies Open at ITFtennis.com

2018 ITF Women's Circuit
2018 in Croatian women's sport
2010s in Zagreb
2018 in Croatian tennis
Zagreb Ladies Open